"El Toro Relajo" (Eng.: The Messy Bull) is a popular mariachi song written by Felipe Bermejo and has been recorded by several artists. Selena recorded the song in 1994 for the soundtrack of the 1995 film Don Juan DeMarco.

Critical reception 
Enrique Lopetegui of the Los Angeles Times wrote: "But it's the two new Spanish  ranchera  songs [El Toro Relajo and Tú Sólo Tú], backed by El Monte's Mariachi Sol de Mexico, that are most impressive, as Selena effortlessly adapted to a difficult style she wasn't very familiar with, However Selena was sick during the recording, so her voice wasn't in good shape."

Linda Ronstadt version
Linda Ronstadt included this track on her album Mas Canciones in 1990.

Selena version
The song was included on the album Dreaming of You, recorded by Selena, and was released as the fifth single from that album (the second in Spanish). The single could not match the success of the previous singles in the Billboard Hot Latin Tracks, peaking only at number 24.

Chart Performance

Personnel
Arranged and produced by: José Hernàndez
Vocals: Selena
Chorus and special guests: Mariachi Sol de México
Engineered by: Bruce Robb
Mixed by: Robb Bross, Productions
Recorded at: Cherokee Studio, CA
Selena's vocals recorded at: Q-Zone Studios, Corpus Christi, TX.

References

1995 singles
Selena songs
Linda Ronstadt songs
Spanish-language songs
Songs released posthumously
Year of song missing